Bradley Lake Park is a public park located in South Hill, Washington. The park was developed and opened shortly after being acquired by the city via voter approved bond in 1997. Bradley Lake Park consists of 59-acres park site, including a 12-acre lake.

Overview 
The park is named after the land's former owner, Mr. Ward Bradley. The lake was originally a peat bog, and was created after 30 years of peat farming. It is estimated that three to four hundred thousand yards of peat were removed during this time span. The lake was formed after the peat was removed and a dam was constructed on the north end of the former bog.

References

External links 
 South Hill Historical Society - Bradley Lake
 City of Puyallup, Parks Department - Bradley lake

1997 establishments in Washington (state)
Parks in Pierce County, Washington
Protected areas established in 1997
Puyallup, Washington